St. Michael Academy or St. Michael's Academy is the name of many schools and other educational institutions. Most have a religious heritage and are named after Saint Michael:

Saint Michael Academy (Catarman), Philippines
St Michael's Academy, Kilwinning, North Ayrshire, Scotland
St. Michael Academy (New York City), United States
Saint Michael's Academy, Spokane, Washington, United States
St. Michael's Catholic Academy (Travis County, Texas), United States
St Michael's Catholic Academy, Billingham, County Durham, England
St. Michael Catholic Academy, Thornhill, Ontario, Canada
Mount Saint Michael Academy, New York City, United States

See also
St. Michael's School (disambiguation)
St. Michael's College (disambiguation)
Saint Michael (disambiguation)